The Star and Death of Joaquin Murieta is a 1982 Soviet musical drama film directed by Vladimir Grammatikov.

Plot 
Joaquin Murieta goes to California with the hope of finding gold there. On the way, he meets a beautiful girl whom he marries, but their happiness was short-lived. Suddenly his wife dies.

Cast 
 Andrey Kharitonov as Joaquin Murieta
 Alyona Belyak as Teresa
 Aleksandr Filippenko as Death
 Eduard Martsevich as Organ-Grinder
 Oksana Bochkova as Little Girl Chile
 Sokrat Abdukadyrov as Three-Fingered
 Semyon Chungak
 Adel Al-Khadad
 Elgudzha Gagishvili
 Igor Surovtsev

References

External links 
 

1982 films
1980s Russian-language films
Soviet drama films
1982 drama films